Krishnavaram  is a village in Bahour Commune of Bahour taluk  in the Union Territory of Puducherry, India. This is the last village of Puducherry district to lie on NH-45A between Puducherry-Cuddalore. In other words, Krishnavaram is the gateway to Puducherry from Cuddalore. There exists an Arch at this village which is mentioned as Mullodai Arch as it lies near Mullodai (Mull Odai). Krishnavaram is also known by the name Mathi Krishnapuram. An ancient Vishnu temple in dilapidated condition exists in this village which needs immediate attention from the devotees.

Geography
Krishnavaram is bordered by  Bahour in the west, Manappattu in the north, Pudukuppam in east and Kanganakuppam village of Tamil nadu in the south.

Villages
Following are the list of villages under Krishnavaram Village Panchayat.

 Krishnavaram
 Koravallimedu
 Sulliyankuppam
 Utchimedu

Road Network
Krishnavaram is connected by Pudukuppam-Soriyankuppam road which runs via Moorthikuppam, Koravallimedu, Krishnavaram, Kuruvinatham.

Gallery

Politics
Krishnavaram  is  a part of Bahour (Union Territory Assembly constituency) which comes under Puducherry (Lok Sabha constituency)

References

External links
Official website of the Government of the Union Territory of Puducherry

Villages in Puducherry district